Andrey Yakimov (born 17 November 1989) is a Belarusian footballer playing currently for Neman Grodno.

Honours
Naftan Novopolotsk
Belarusian Cup winner: 2011–12

External links
 
 
 Profile at Naftan website

1989 births
Living people
Belarusian footballers
Association football midfielders
FC Naftan Novopolotsk players
FC Volna Pinsk players
FC Vitebsk players
FC Neman Grodno players